Norwegian goat breeds  are used for the production of milk, cheese and meat.  
There are two primary Norwegian goat breeds, the Norwegian milk goat (norsk melkegeit)  and the coastal goat (kystgeit). In addition there are smaller herds of Cashmere  goats, Angora  goats and Boer goats.

References

External links
Norwegian Goat
Norwegian Association of Sheep and Goat Farmers (NSG) 
Goat breeds
Dairy goat breeds
Meat goat breeds
Goat breeds originating in Norway